Sthenias borneanus is a species of beetle in the family Cerambycidae. It was described by Stephan von Breuning in 1982. It is known from Borneo.

References

borneanus
Beetles described in 1982